The Red Room is a fictional location appearing in American comic books published by Marvel Comics. The Soviet training facility was created to produce highly specialized spies, including Black Widows Natasha Romanova and Yelena Belova.

In the Marvel Cinematic Universe (MCU), the Red Room appeared in Agent Carter,  Avengers: Age of Ultron, and eventually became a flying fortress in Black Widow.

Fictional history

Origins
In the Marvel Universe, The Red Room (Красная комната) is one of the K.G.B.'s espionage training programs. For decades it was a Cold War facility to train female spies known as Black Widows. In some stories, it employs biochemical enhancements for its agents and also implants them with false memories, similar to the Weapon Plus Program. It also trains mutants as agents.

Black Widow Ops Program
In the work of Richard K. Morgan, the Red Room recruits 28 orphan girls to become undetectable deep-cover agents to infiltrate China and the West. Professor Grigor Chelintsov uses psychotechnics to imprint them with fabricated memories. making them believe they were trained in ballet at the Bolshoi Theatre. Furthermore, the girls received a special treatment designed by biochemist Lyudmila Kudrin that allows them, for decades, to remain young, healthy and resilient at superhuman levels.

Wolf Spider Ops Program
Niko Constantin was the only male trainee of the Red Room's male equivalent of the Black Widow Ops program dubbed "Wolf Spider". He proved an effective killer, but impossible to control, leading the program to be declared a failure. Years later, he was found imprisoned in a Russian gulag, leading a gang of convicts dubbed the Wolf Spiders, and holding a grudge against Bucky Barnes, one of the Wolf Spider trainers.

Yelena Belova
The K.G.B. continued to use the Red Room in the late 1970s. It successfully trained their agent Yelena Belova, though she soon left the service.

North Institute
Natasha Romanova, weary of espionage and adventure, retires to Arizona but is targeted, as were the other Black Widow graduates of the Red Room, by the North Institute, on behalf of the Gynacon corporation. Romanova's investigations leads her back to Russia, where she is appalled to learn the extent of her past manipulation. She discovers the Black Widows are being hunted because Gynacon, having purchased Russian biotechnology from Red Room's successor agency 2R, wants all prior users of the technology dead. After killing Gynacon CEO Ian McMasters, she clashes with operatives of multiple governments to help Sally Anne Carter, a girl Natasha befriended in her investigations, whom she rescued with help from Daredevil and Yelena Belova.

Omega Red
The Red Room featured in Uncanny X-Men. The group bought Omega Red's freedom with the hopes of using him to their own ends. Wolverine, Colossus, and Nightcrawler encounter him after he escaped from his master and they engage in combat. Omega Red is mostly impervious to Wolverine's claws; the Red Room had been experimenting on him in an effort to enhance his healing factor. After Nightcrawler intervenes and knocks Omega Red unconscious, he is returned to S.H.I.E.L.D. custody.

Widowmaker
In the Widowmaker comic, the Red Room was the site of a mass slaughter of K.G.B recruits by the Dark Ocean Society and Ronin as part of a false flag operation to force a war between Russia and Japan, intended to restore Russia's former glory. However the operation was foiled by the combined efforts of Natasha Romanova, Hawkeye, Mockingbird, and Dominic Fortune.

All-New, All-Different Marvel
The All-New, All-Different Marvel was revealed that Hank Pym's daughter Nadia van Dyne through first wife Maria Trovaya was raised in the Red Room.

In other media

Television
 The television series Agent Carter depicts Dorothy "Dottie" Underwood (portrayed by Bridget Regan) as a precursor to the Black Widow program.

Films
 The 2015 film Avengers: Age of Ultron shows Natasha Romanoff forced to recall her own training in the Red Room by Madame B. (portrayed by Julie Delpy) due to Wanda Maximoff's mind controlling spells.
 The Red Room is featured in the 2021 film Black Widow, in which the leader of the organization is named Dreykov, portrayed by Ray Winstone. The organization trained millions of "Black Widows" assassins until Natasha Romanoff and Clint Barton bombed Dreykov's offices, supposedly ending the program. However, Dreykov emerges alive and continues the program until he is stopped once again in 2016.

References

External links
 Red Room at Marvel Wiki

Black Widow (Marvel Comics)
Marvel Comics locations